USS Potomac was a frigate in the United States Navy laid down by the Washington Navy Yard in August 1819 and launched in March 1822. Fitting out was not completed until 1831, when Captain John Downes assumed command as first commanding officer. Although called a "44" 1st class, she was built to mount 32 carronades on her spar deck, 30 long guns on her gun deck, two bow and three stern chasers on each of these decks, significantly under-rating her on the rating system of the Royal Navy.

Service history
On her first overseas cruise, Potomac departed New York 19 August 1831 for the Pacific Squadron via the Cape of Good Hope on the first Sumatran Expedition. On 6 February 1832, Potomac destroyed the town of Kuala Batee in retaliation for the capture there in February of the previous year of the American merchantman Friendship, which had been recaptured and returned to Salem to report the murder of many of her crew. Of Potomacs 282 sailors and Marines who landed, two were killed while 150 natives died, including Mahomet, the chieftain. After circumnavigating the world, Potomac returned to Boston 23 May 1834.

The frigate next made two cruises to the Brazil Station, protecting American interests in Latin America from 20 October 1834 to 5 March 1837, and from 12 May 1840 to 31 July 1842. From 8 December 1844 to 4 December 1845, she patrolled in the West Indies, and again from 14 March 1846 to 20 July 1847 in the Caribbean and the Gulf. During this latter period, she landed troops at Port Isabel, Texas, on 8 May 1846 in support of General Zachary Taylor's army at the Battle of Palo Alto. She also participated in the siege of Vera Cruz, 9 to 28 March 1847.

Potomac served as flagship for the Home Squadron 1855–1856. At the outbreak of the American Civil War, she departed from New York City on 10 September 1861 for the Gulf Blockading Squadron off Mobile Bay. The Potomac became the stores ship for the squadron and remained at Pensacola Navy Yard as a receiving ship until 1867, when she was sent to Philadelphia. She remained at League Island Navy Yard until she decommissioned 13 January 1877. She was sold to E. Stannard & Company 24 May 1877.

See also

 Union Navy

References
 

Ships of the Union Navy
Potomac 1
1822 ships